Dianne C. Whalen (May 3, 1951 – October 3, 2010) was a Canadian politician and provincial Cabinet Minister in Newfoundland and Labrador.

Early life
Whalen was born in Come By Chance, Newfoundland and Labrador, raised in Port Blandford and lived for 40 years in Paradise where she served as mayor for 18 years.

Political career
Whalen was one of several star candidates that helped bring the Progressive Conservatives back to power in 2003 after 14 years in opposition. She was elected to represent the district of Conception Bay East and Bell Island in the Newfoundland and Labrador House of Assembly. Whalen was re-elected in 2007 and served as MHA and Minister until her death in 2010. Whalen was appointed to Danny Williams' first Cabinet in 2003 as the Minister of Government Services. She remained in the Government Services portfolio till 2007 when she was appointed Minister of Transportation and Works. On October 31, 2008, she became Minister of Municipal Affairs, Minister Responsible for Emergency Preparedness, and as Registrar General.

In the fall of 2009 Whalen went off on sick leave after being hospitalized as a result of illness. With the re-opening of the House of Assembly in March 2010 Whalen resumed her duties as MHA and Minister. On October 3, 2010, Premier Williams announced that Whalen had died following a fight with cancer.

References

1951 births
2010 deaths
Deaths from cancer in Newfoundland and Labrador
Women MHAs in Newfoundland and Labrador
Progressive Conservative Party of Newfoundland and Labrador MHAs
People from Paradise, Newfoundland and Labrador
Mayors of places in Newfoundland and Labrador
Women mayors of places in Newfoundland and Labrador
21st-century Canadian politicians
21st-century Canadian women politicians
Newfoundland and Labrador municipal councillors